The Lagoon School is a private all-girls primary and secondary school located in Lekki, in Lagos State, Nigeria.  It has about seven hundred students in the secondary section and about two hundred and fifty pupils in the primary section and a hundred members of staff.

History 
The school was established in September 1995 in Surulere and later moved to Lekki.

Mentoring Program
As part of the school activities, the school recently organized this program to assist their wards in area of Music and Art.
The program is fashioned as an eye opener to the students and also to bring the curiosity about the world outside the four corners of the school.

External links
 Official website

References

Secondary schools in Lagos State
Girls' schools in Lagos
Educational institutions established in 1995
1995 establishments in Nigeria